Charles Wilson Capps, Jr. (January 1, 1925 – December 25, 2009) was a Mississippi politician and legislator.

He was sheriff of Bolivar County, Mississippi in 1964. From 1972 until 2005, he was a member of the Mississippi House of Representatives.

References

External links

People from Bolivar County, Mississippi
Military personnel from Mississippi
University of Mississippi alumni
Members of the Mississippi House of Representatives
1925 births
2009 deaths
20th-century American politicians
United States Army personnel of World War II